Universe is the first studio album by the instrumental rock/progressive metal band Planet X, released on June 6, 2000 through Inside Out Music. The album is essentially a continuation of keyboardist Derek Sherinian's 1999 debut solo release Planet X, but this time as a full band effort featuring guitarist Tony MacAlpine and drummer Virgil Donati.

Critical reception

Glenn Astarita at All About Jazz gave Universe a positive review, recommending it for both "technically inclined prog-heads" and "those who feel that they've heard it all." He praised each musician for their technical prowess, but remarked that it was sometimes difficult to differentiate between MacAlpine's guitar and Sherinian's keyboard.

Robert Taylor at AllMusic gave Universe four stars out of five, saying that "Some of the selections tend to sound the same, but the inventive soloing of each player more than makes up it" and calling it "A fine effort by a very powerful trio".

Track listing

Personnel

Tony MacAlpine – guitar, production
Derek Sherinian – keyboard, production
Virgil Donati – drums, production
Tom Kennedy – bass
Dick Smothers Jr. – spoken vocals (track 5)
Albert Law – engineering
T. J. Helmerich – engineering
Greg D'Angelo – engineering
Tom Fletcher – mixing
Gene Grimaldi – mastering

References

External links
In Review: Planet X "Universe" at Guitar Nine Records

Planet X (band) albums
2000 debut albums
Inside Out Music albums